Henri Joseph Brugère (Uzerche, 27 June 1841 - Lautaret, 31 August 1918) was a French divisional general.

Career
On 4 October 1914, German attacks by the II Cavalry Corps (General Georg von der Marwitz) and the XIV Reserve Corps drove the group of the 81st, 82nd, 84th and 88th Territorial divisions (General Joseph Brugère) back from Hébuterne, Gommecourt and Monchy au Bois to the north. The French XI Corps attacked at Beaumont Hamel on 19 November but failed to capture the village, after being held up by uncut wire. A diversion was conducted by XI Corps from  1915 at Toutvent Farm,  to the north, during the Second Battle of Artois.

Footnotes

References

External links

French generals
Grand Croix of the Légion d'honneur
French military personnel of World War I
French military personnel of the Franco-Prussian War
Military governors of Paris
École Polytechnique alumni
1841 births
1918 deaths